La Vida Lena is a 2020–2022 Philippine television drama revenge series broadcast by Kapamilya Channel, starring Erich Gonzales. The fast-cut version was streamed on iWantTFC from November 14, 2020 to January 16, 2021. The full series was aired on the network's Primetime Bida evening block and worldwide via TFC from June 28, 2021 to February 4, 2022, with simulcast on A2Z and TV5.

Plot
Despite being the subject of bullying and discrimination because of the big scar on her face, Magda refuses to let criticisms get to her and strives hard to secure a comfortable life for her family. Using her skills and intelligence, she hits the jackpot when the soap she created quickly gains popularity in the town of Salvacion. However, the young lady's success does not sit well with the Narciso family, the owners of Royal Wellness, the biggest surgical and cosmetic company in the country. When Magda refuses to sell her formula to the Narcisos due to their contrasting views, a string of bad luck comes her way. Losing everything dear to her, Magda returns with a new face, armed with determination to retaliate against the powerful clan who ruined her life.

Cast and characters

Main cast
 Erich Gonzales as Magdalena "Magda / Lena" Mendoza Narciso-Cabrera
 Carlo Aquino as Jordan A. Cabrera
 JC de Vera as Adrian R. Narciso /Adrian R. Suarez
 Kit Thompson as Miguel Villarica

Supporting cast 
 Agot Isidro as Vanessa Rubio-Narciso
 Raymond Bagatsing as Lukas Narciso
 Janice de Belen as Ramona Joaquin
 Sofia Andres as Rachel Suarez-Villarica
 Pen Medina as Francisco "Kiko" Cabrera
 Ruby Ruiz as Digna Abuel-Cabrera
 Christian Vasquez as Conrad Suarez
 Malou Crisologo as Martina Ramirez
 Josh Ivan Morales as Brian Rubio
 Hasna Cabral as Bettina "Betchay" Buenafe
 Renshi de Guzman as Rambo Lumba
 Danica Ontengco as Allison Suarez / Alice Garcia

Guest cast
 Soliman Cruz as Diosdado "Dado" Mendoza
 Isay Alvarez as Helen Mendoza
 Miguel Faustmann as Don Luis Narciso
 Giovanni Baldesseri as Fernando Castro

Production

Casting
Ivana Alawi was originally cast for the lead role, with a working title Lihim ni Ligaya. The pre-production had started and the cast was already introduced during a presscon back in February 2020. Due to COVID-19 pandemic and enhanced community quarantine in Luzon in March 2020, Alawi backed out of the project; her main reason was to avoid risking the health of her family as she will be exposed during lock-in tapings. In August, Deo Endrinal, the head of Dreamscape Entertainment, approached Erich Gonzales to take on the lead role. The title of the series is officially named La Vida Lena, inspired by Jojo Saguin, one of the directors who is known to her colleague named Lena. From Ligaya, the lead character's name was changed to Magdalena Mendoza. Several recasting and revisions in the script are being made to suit the new theme and new cast. La Vida Lena served as Gonzales' return to television two years after playing her first triple role in The Blood Sisters (2018).

Filming duration
Pre-production started in September 2020. The entire cast and crew underwent rigorous procedures and COVID-19 protocols before heading down to their filming location at Antipolo. The first cycle of lock-in taping started on October 1, 2020, and finished on October 17, 2020. Second cycle of taping resumed on November 15, 2020, and finished on December 4, 2020. Third cycle of taping started on January 10, 2021, and finished on January 30, 2021. The fourth and final cycle of taping concluded in February 2021.

See also
List of programs broadcast by Kapamilya Channel
List of programs broadcast by Kapamilya Online Live
List of programs broadcast by Jeepney TV
List of programs broadcast by A2Z (Philippine TV channel)
List of programs broadcast by TV5 (Philippine TV network)
List of ABS-CBN drama series

Notes

References

External links
 
 La Vida Lena on iWantTFC

ABS-CBN drama series
IWantTFC original programming
Television series about revenge
Philippine drama television series
Philippine romance television series
2020 Philippine television series debuts
2022 Philippine television series endings
Television series by Dreamscape Entertainment Television
Filipino-language television shows
Television shows set in the Philippines